
The following are lists of Celluloid Dreams productions by decade:

Lists 
List of Celluloid Dreams productions (1990–1999)
List of Celluloid Dreams productions (2000–2009)
List of Celluloid Dreams productions (2010–2019)
List of Celluloid Dreams productions (2020–2029)

See also
 Celluloid Dreams
 :Category: Lists of films by studio

Lists of films by studio